The Deževa Agreement concluded in 1282 in Deževa changed the policy of the medieval Kingdom of Serbia.

In 1282, King Stefan Dragutin was replaced by Stefan Milutin, his younger brother, with the royal title to revert after his death to  one of Stefan Dragutin's sons. The official version of the incident is that King Dragutin's horse fell in the vicinity of Fort Jeleč, incapacitating him with a broken leg. The Serbian Archbishop Danilo II reports great confusion after the accident, and the people, facing the threat of attack from a neighbor, forced King Stephan to hand over the royal title to his brother.

As part of the agreement, King Milutin took the Bulgarian princess Anna Terter as a wife and radically changed the foreign policy, directing it to the seizure of Byzantine possessions, becoming an ally of the Second Bulgarian Empire.  

A large temple dedicated to Saint Sava is being built on the site.

References 

13th century in Serbia
Nemanjić dynasty
1280s treaties